Shannon D. Pinto is an American politician serving as a member of the New Mexico Senate. A member of the Democratic Party, Pinto represents the 3rd district, which includes Shiprock, New Mexico and part of Navajo Nation.

Early life and education 
A member of Navajo Nation, Pinto was born and raised in Tohatchi, New Mexico. She earned an Associate's degree in Business from the Southwestern Indian Polytechnic Institute and a Bachelor of Business Administration from the University of New Mexico.

Career 
After the death of her grandfather, John Pinto, Shannon was appointed by Governor Michelle Lujan Grisham to fill his vacant seat in the New Mexico Senate. The elder Pinto had served in the Senate from 1977 until 2019, when he died at the age of 94. The district, Senate District 3, is largely rural and predominantly Native American; it stretches from Gallup to Shiprock.

She took office on July 25, 2019.

References 

Democratic Party New Mexico state senators
Women state legislators in New Mexico
University of New Mexico alumni
Navajo people
Year of birth missing (living people)
Living people
People from McKinley County, New Mexico
21st-century American politicians
21st-century American women politicians
21st-century Native Americans
21st-century Native American women